Nightlife is a collective term for entertainment that is available and generally more popular from the late evening into the early hours of the morning. It includes pubs, bars, nightclubs, parties, live music, concerts, cabarets, theatre, cinemas, and shows. These venues often require a cover charge for admission. Nightlife entertainment is often more adult-oriented than daytime entertainment. People who prefer to be active during the night-time are called night owls.

History
The lack of electric lighting, as well as the needs of agricultural labor, made staying up after dark difficult for most people. Larger ancient cities, such as Rome, had a reputation for danger at night. This changed in 17th and 18th-century Europe (and subsequently spread beyond) due to the development and implementation of artificial lighting: more domestic lights, added street lighting, and adaptation by the royal and upper social classes. The introduction of chocolate, coffee and tea, and cafes that stayed open through dawn, became part of the new culture.

Sociological research 

Nightlife has been a vibrant area of research for sociologists. Nightlife establishments including pubs, bars, and nightclubs function as third places, according to Ray Oldenburg in The Great Good Place. New York City Mayor Eric Adams earned the nickname "Nightlife Mayor" due to his penchant for frequently clubbing in the city on Friday and Saturday nights.

Some sociologists have argued that vibrant city nightlife scenes contribute to the development of culture as well as political movements. David Grazian cites as examples the development of beat poetry, musical styles including bebop, urban blues and early rock, and the importance of nightlife for the development of the gay rights movement in the United States kicked off by the riots at the Stonewall Inn nightclub in Greenwich Village, Lower Manhattan, New York City.

There is debate about the degree to which nightlife contributes positively to social capital and the public goods of society. David Grazian points out that nightlife can "replicate the same structures of race, ethnic, and class inequality and exclusion found in the larger society."

Grazian cites the use of dress codes by some nightlife establishments in the United States—mostly nightclubs—that specifically targets clothing popularized by hip hop culture represents a form of informal discrimination and segregation on racial grounds. He also noted that nightclubs and club culture can create an environment that encourage or tolerate the "harassment and degradation of women," citing the expectation that both female workers and patrons of bars and nightclubs engage in highly sexualized performances of femininity including dressing in a particularly sexual manner in order to gain entrance to clubs.

Regulation

Australia 
Nightlife venues must be licensed to serve alcohol.

United Kingdom 
Nightlife venues must be licensed to serve alcohol under the Licensing Act 2003 (and the Licensing (Scotland) Act 2005 in Scotland). Venues with door security ("bouncers") are also required to ensure that the security staff are licensed by the Security Industry Authority.

Since the introduction of the Licensing Act 2003, pubs and bars have been able to apply to operate until later. For nightclubs, this has become a form of competition as patrons can stay in the same pub or bar rather than move on to a club.

United States 
In the United States, legislation affecting nightlife is handled primarily at state and local levels.

References 

 
Drinking culture